The/Nudge Institute (formerly The/Nudge Foundation) is an Indian non-profit organization. It was established in July 2015 in Bengaluru. The/Nudge exists to alleviate poverty, sustainably, collaboratively and scalably. It has three impact streams to tackle the complex issue of poverty from multiple angles – Centre for Skill Development and Entrepreneurship (CSDE), Centre for Social Innovation (CSI) & Centre for Rural Development (CRD).

Under these impact streams, The/Nudge has uplifted over 15 million lives as of 2020, with over 45 corporate and philanthropic foundation partners and 2000+ donors, including notable names like  The Rockefeller Foundation, Tata Trusts, Facebook, Amazon, Mphasis, PayTM, Nandan Nilekani and others.

The/Nudge also runs The Forum – a global think tank and a platform to come together for India's development journey.

The/Nudge Centre for Skill Development and Entrepreneurship (CSDE) 
The/Nudge Centre for Skill Development and Entrepreneurship (CSDE) paves the way for underprivileged youth to lead flourishing lives, through skilling and enabling employment. In five years and 10 states across India, CSDE has served over 20,000 youth.

Under CSDE, "Gurukul” residential training program was started in 2015, as a 90-day rigorous Program for Life Management (PLM) to deliver a transformative impetus to disadvantaged youth. Later “Future Perfect” began its activities in 2020, which is an online version of Gurukul, developed as a COVID-19 response, but growing to CSDE's most promising and ambitious initiative yet. It includes selection filters, training, employment and post-employment support. Future Perfect is currently witnessing ~3,500 enrolments monthly, with 300+ online parallel classrooms running every day. Future Perfect focuses on employability of youth through English and 21st-century skills such as problem solving, interpersonal skills and career planning, in addition to vocational skills. Placement assistance (100%) and job-retention are provided as well.

The/Nudge Centre for Social Innovation (CSI) 
CSI’s mission is to ‘nudge and nurture top talent to solve for India’s biggest challenges, at scale’. This is being achieved through a plethora of powerful initiatives like

 Incubator for non-profit startups (up to 15L + funding and ecosystem support)
 Accelerator for non-profit startups (up to 2 crores + capacity building and ecosystem support)
 Project Pioneer: research innovation grant (land and property rights for inclusivity)
 Saamuhika Shakti (waste pickers project)
 Prize challenges like Cisco Agri Challenge (a 2cr prize contest for farmer-centric innovation)
 Indian Administrative Fellowship (Public-Private Partnerships for nation building)

In 3.5 years, 81+ non-profit startups have been incubated through CSI, with 15x fund multiplier effect and over 9 million lives reach.

The/Nudge Centre for Social Innovation has infused entrepreneurial energy into the development sector’s ecosystem and has built huge momentum in creating impactful solutions for empowering the disadvantaged. Every industry has been disrupted by startups, game-changing models of strategic collaboration and innovation for scale- except the social sector which still largely follows tired old narratives. However, this is changing. Disruption - which is the DNA of entrepreneurship, ambitious thought-partnerships and collective action - is now infusing India’s public and development sectors to reshape the future. CSI works in this space.

Notable accomplishments of alumni 
The/Nudge CSI (earlier known as N/Core) supports the most promising startups in social innovation. Many of their incubatees have gone on to win international accolades for their innovations and path-breaking work. Notable alumni include:

 Samuel Rajkumar - founder, Foundation for Environmental Monitoring and winner of Atal New India Challenge
 Swapnil Chaturvedi - founder, SmartLOO, Samagra, and winner of Infosys Aarohan Social Innovation Award – 2019
 Ruchit Nagar and Mohammed Shahnawaz - founders, Khushi Baby and MIT Solvers - 2019 
 Seemant Dadwal - founder, Meraki Foundation and winner of Fast Company's 2019 World-Changing Ideas Award 
 Kruti Bharucha - founder, Peepul listed on BusinessWorld's 2019 40under40 
 Piyush Verma – Founder, Manush Labs (Forbes 30 under 30 Feb 2021)

The/Nudge Centre for Rural Development (CRD) 

After two years of work in 80 villages (predominantly Jharkhand), CRD has transformed 5000+ ‘ultra-poor’ lives, 1200+ households through livelihood generation and access to social welfare nets, using the ‘Graduation approach’ to poverty alleviation. This successful model will be scaled nationally over the next few years.

Globally, 650 million people are estimated to be living in extreme poverty. In India, approximately 10% of the population lives in ‘extreme poverty’ (70 million). They are variously referred to as ‘extreme poor’, ‘ultra-poor’, ‘poorest of the poor’. ‘Ultra-poor’ are globally understood to be the 1.2 billion people living on less than $1.9 per day. They face the largest obstacles to climb out of poverty. Most of them live in South Asia (close to 507 million living on $1.9 or less a day), followed by sub-Saharan Africa (close to 414 million living on $1.9 or less  a day) and East Asia and the Pacific (close to 251 million living on $1.9 or less a day).  The ultra-poor are a separate segment, with many significant differences, from the “poor.” The households at this level of poverty are tied to availability of wage labour. They tend to be food insecure, living on less than 2 meals a day. Malnutrition exacerbates illnesses that further drain resources, leading to borrowings from exploitative moneylenders. They own few or no assets of even a non-durable nature (such as livestock), have limited livelihood prospects and are geographically and socially isolated.

For graduation out of ‘ultra-poverty’, first there is an identification of districts, blocks, villages for mobilization of households for the program, and then selection and validation of extreme poor households. The second part of the strategy includes consumption support for food security and initial grant for livelihood creation. Further, there is an inclusion of participants into SHGs, Social inclusion by registering participants into government registers, Financial inclusion by starting savings activities and linking to government funds. Other vital steps are local market analysis and livelihood planning, market linkage, technical skills training and life skills training. Last part of the strategy comprises linkage to microfinance and government schemes.

The 5-year goal of CRD (by 2025) is to enable 50,000+ poor families to graduate out of poverty through direct implementation, and rebuild the lives of 2.5 million people through the Hope Fund, a likely $30 mn fund.

The/Nudge Forum 
A platform for collective thought and action with cross-industry stakeholders. The Nudge/Forum is a think-tank that exists to expedite India's development sector and make them aspirational for talent. It started in 2017 and was accredited as an Atal Incubation Center by NITI Aayog in 2019. It bridges all stakeholders together and musters thoughts and ideas for action enabling wide social reach.

References 

Non-profit organisations based in India
Poverty-related organizations
Organizations established in 2015